Walter Nadzak Jr. (born July 14, 1936) is a former college football coach, college baseball coach, and athletic director.  Nadzak's 35-year career took him to four schools, serving as head baseball coach and assistant football coach at Division III Muskingum, head football coach and athletic director at Juniata, head football coach at then-Division I-AA Connecticut, and finally athletic director at The Citadel.

Playing career
Nadzak played football and baseball at Division III Denison, where he was a four-year letterman in both sports.

After graduation, Nadzak was commissioned in the United States Marine Corps, in which he served for eight years.

Coaching career

Juniata
Nadzak coached for eight seasons at Juniata, leading the Eagles to the inaugural Division III national championship game.

Connecticut
Nadzak coached UConn for six seasons, including a pair of Yankee Conference co-championships.

The Citadel
The Southern Conference baseball tournament Most Outstanding Player award is named for Nadzak, in recognition of his time running the event.  The tournament took up long time residence in Charleston as a result.

Head coaching record

Football

References

1936 births
Living people
UConn Huskies football coaches
Denison Big Red baseball players
Denison Big Red football players
Juniata Eagles football coaches
Muskingum Fighting Muskies baseball coaches
Muskingum Fighting Muskies football coaches
The Citadel Bulldogs athletic directors